The second season of the American Spanish-language reality television series La casa de los famosos premiered on May 10, 2022, with a live move-in on Telemundo. The show follows a group of celebrities living in a house together while being constantly filmed with no communication with the outside world as they compete to be the last competitor remaining to win the cash grand prize.

The season was announced on November 16, 2021. Héctor Sandarti and Jimena Gallego returned as hosts of the series.

The season concluded on August 8, 2022, after 91 days of competition with Ivonne Montero being crowned the winner, and Salvador Zerboni the runner-up.

Format 
The season follows 17 celebrities living in a house together with no communication with the outside world and are constantly filmed during their time in the house. During their stay the Housemates share their thoughts on events of the house inside a private room referred to as the Confesionario (Confession Room). Each week, the housemates compete in the Head of Household competition, with the winner being immune from eviction. Each housemate has three nomination points to give to two housemates, giving 2 points to one housemate and 1 point to the other. The housemates with the most nomination points are put up for eviction and the Head of Household must save one of the nominees. A change this season is that the four housemates with the most nomination points are put up for eviction, unlike the previous season where the top three were put up for eviction. The public at home is able to vote on which housemate to evict via the show's main website. Beginning the eighth week, the public had to vote on which housemate they wanted to stay in the house, with the least voted housemate being evicted. Each week the housemates are assigned tasks in order to win their allowance for food.

Twists

Spontaneous Nomination 
During episode 6, the Spontaneous Nomination was introduced. The spontaneous nomination gives only one houseguest per week the advantage to give nomination points of 3 and 2 instead of the usual 2 and 1. The spontaneous nomination is open immediately after the eviction and closes before the regular nomination process. The spontaneous nomination phase concluded after week 6 nominations.

Housemates 
The seventeen HouseGuests were announced throughout April and May 2022.

Nominations table 
Every week, each participant is called to nominate two of their housemates, with the exception of that week's Head of Household. The first person a housemate nominates is for 2 points, whilst the second nomination is for just 1 point. The three participants with highest points, are nominated for elimination and it is up to the public's vote through Telemundo.com who gets evicted that week.

: The housemates were able to vote on which of the nominees they wanted to save. Nacho received the most votes and was saved from eviction.
: Nacho used the spontaneous nomination to give Brenda 3 nomination points and Natalia 2 points instead of the usual points of 2 and 1.
: Laura used the spontaneous nomination to give Niurka 3 points and Ivonne 2 points.
: On Day 13, Niurka was asked to open one of three envelopes each containing the name of Week 2 final nominees. The chosen envelope contained Natalia's name and she was awarded the power of voiding the nominations of any housemate. Natalia chose to void Laura's nominations.
: The HoH competition was played in teams. Niurka and Toni won the competition and became Co-Head of Households. However only one could move in to the HoH room and Niurka won a face-off competition against Toni for the room.
: Eduardo used the spontaneous nomination to give Natalia 3 points and Ivonne 2 points.
: On Day 20, Week 3 final nominees were given a deck of cards and the housemate who picked the Joker card won the power to give 5 nomination points to three housemates. Lewis picked the Joker card and was granted the advantage to give nomination points of 2, 2, and 1 instead of the usual points of 2 and 1.
: Lewis used the spontaneous nomination to give Rafael 3 points and Julia 2 points.
: On Day 27, Week 4 final nominees rolled dice three times, the houseguest with the highest number won the power of voiding the nominations of any housemate. Natalia won and chose to void Daniella's nominations.
: Laura used the spontaneous nomination to give Osvaldo 3 points and Lewis 2 points.
: On Day 34, Week 5 final nominees rolled dice, the houseguest with the highest number won the power of voiding the nominations of any housemate. Rafael won and chose to void Lewis' nominations.
: Due to discussing about which nominee to save, Nacho did not have the power to save one of the nominees.
: Daniella, Laura, Rafael and Salvador had their nominations voided due to conspiring about nominations to rig the results, which is against the rules.
: On Day 50, it was revealed that the public would now vote on who they wanted to save from eviction and not who they wanted to get evicted. The housemate with the least amount of votes will be the one to get evicted.
: On Day 55, Daniella won the power of removing three nomination points against her.
: On Day 62, Ivonne won the power of removing three nomination points against her.
: Ivonne won the final competition, winning immunity from the final eviction and granting her a place in the finale.

Total received nominations

Episodes

References 

2022 American television seasons